Together/Apart is the third studio album by American hip hop artist Grieves. It was released on Rhymesayers Entertainment in 2011. The album features guest appearances from Brother Ali and Krukid.

Critical reception
At Metacritic, which assigns a weighted average score out of 100 to reviews from mainstream critics, Together/Apart received an average score of 70% based on 11 reviews, indicating "generally favorable reviews".

Track listing

Charts

References

External links
 

2011 albums
Rhymesayers Entertainment albums
Hip hop albums by American artists
Albums produced by Budo (musician)